The bâtiments ravitailleurs de forces, or BRF, are a class of future fleet tankers that are to replace the  units in French Navy service. Until January 2019, the programme was known as Flotte logistique (abbreviated FLOTLOG in military parlance). First ship of the class completed the first stage of her sea trials in January 2023 and was formally delivered to the French Navy in March to continue her sea trials.

History 
Replacement for the  type has been considered by the French Navy since 2009, with the military procurement law for years 2009–2014. At the time, the concept was knows as "flotte logistique" ("logistical fleet", or FLOTLOG). The succession was envisioned to take place between 2017 and 2020. The replacement was motivated both by the age of the Durance hulls, and by their non-conformity with current safety standards, notably the lack of a double hull. From 2010, Naval Group (the still named DCNS) proposed a project named BRAVE. This project was carried over to the following procurement law (2014 to 2019), delaying the order of the first unit to 2019. However, after STX France was purchased by Fincantieri, the project by Naval Group was abandoned and it was decided to base the new concept on the Italian fleet tanker , then being built by Fincantieri for the Italian Navy. The FLOTLOG programme was further confirmed in the new military procurement law.

On 30 January 2019, OCCAR ordered four units from Chantiers de l'Atlantique and Naval Group for the French Navy. It is anticipated that the first two ships of the class, plus the fourth (Gustave Zédé), will be based in Toulon while the third ship of the class (Émile Bertin) will be based at Brest.

Construction 
The four units of the class are to be constructed in Saint-Nazaire, at Chantiers de l'Atlantique. Building of the first ship was initially planned for early 2020 for delivery in 2022, with the three further ships being delivered from 2013 through 2029. In 2021, it was indicated that delivery of the first ship had slipped to 2023. The steel cutting ceremony for the first ship took place on 18 May 2020. The ship was launched in April 2022 and sea trials began on 20 December 2022. She was formally delivered to the French Navy on 3 March 2023 to continue her sea trials. 

These ships are among the largest units of the French Navy, second only to the aircraft carrier .

Dimensions 

 Length : 
 Beam : 
 Draught : 
 Displacement :  empty,  full load
 Crew : 130 crew, with up to 60 passengers
 Diesel-electric propulsion
 Capacity :  of fuel

Four ships are scheduled to be commissioned in the French Navy as replacement for the Durance-class tankers. On 18 May 2020, the navy published the names intended for the ships, which honour preeminent French naval engineers: Jacques Chevallier, Jacques Stosskopf, Louis-Émile Bertin and Gustave Zédé.

Defensive weapons will include the Simbad-RC system firing Mistral Mk3 surface-to-air missiles (for at least the first ship in the series) and two Thales/Nexter 40 mm RAPIDFire guns. The first guns of the type were installed on Jacques Chevallier in February 2023. In March it was confirmed that two Simbad-RC short-range SAM/SSM systems had been installed on the ship, on a platform located behind the bridge. This was said to represent the first deployment of the Simbad-RC system variant with the French Navy.

Ships of the class

See also 
 Future of the French Navy
 Vulcano-class logistic support ship

Citations

External links 
 

Auxiliary ships of the French Navy
Auxiliary replenishment ship classes
Proposed ships